Danielle Winitskowski de Azevedo, (Rio de Janeiro, Brazil, 5 December 1973), known as Danielle Winits, is a Brazilian actress, dancer, and singer. She has appeared as a regular in several Brazilian TV series and also played the Velma Kelly character in a Brazilian adaptation of the musical Chicago. Danielle Winits has also posed twice for the Brazilian Playboy.

Biography 
Danielle took courses in ballet, arts and acting, and became an actress in theatre, cinema and television. In the theater, she has always preferred musicals, where she has excelled as a dancer and singer. She began her television career in 1993, in the Brazilian miniseries, Sex Appeal. Her theatrical debut came the following year in the musical Band-Aid. Her first film role was in 1999 in the film Até que a Vida nos Separe.

Personal life
Her grandfather, Rubens Vieira Winitskowski, was a member of the 1st Fighter Group of the Brazilian Air Force, sent to fight in Italy in World War II as a third-sergeant, part of the ground support team.

Between 2005 and 2010, she was married to actor and model Cássio Reis. On 19 December 2007, gave birth to their son, her first child, Noah.

On 8 December 2010, she married actor Jonatas Faro. The couple divorced in March 2011 but they had a son, named Guy, born on 28 April 2011.

Career

Television

Cinema

Theatre

Awards

References

1973 births
Living people
People from Rio de Janeiro (city)
Brazilian people of Polish descent
Brazilian people of Russian descent
Brazilian telenovela actresses
Brazilian television actresses
Brazilian musical theatre actresses
Brazilian film actresses
Actresses from Rio de Janeiro (city)